OREC,  Organisation of Rice Exporting Countries
OREC, offshore wind renewable energy certificate